Trautenstein is a village in the borough of Oberharz am Brocken in the district of Harz in the German state of Saxony-Anhalt. Trautenstein has 493 inhabitants . Formerly an independent municipality, it was merged into the town Hasselfelde in 2002, which was merged into Oberharz am Brocken in 2010.

Geography 
The small climatic health resort lies in the valley of the Rappbode and at the southwestern end of the Rappbode Reservoir. South of the village is the Bärenhöhe ("Bear Heights"), also known as the Carlshaushöhe, which is 626 metres high. On the summit is the popular Carlshaus Tower, a telecommunication and observation tower of the Harz Narrow Gauge Railway.

Larger towns and villages in the vicinity include Braunlage, Bad Lauterberg, Bad Harzburg (in Lower Saxony) as well as Blankenburg, Wernigerode and Hasselfelde (in Saxony-Anhalt). The most important link road is the B 242 from Hasselfelde to Braunlage which passes through Trautenstein.

South of Trautenstein in the forest is a refuge hut, the Walzenhütte (521 m), which is checkpoint 50 in the Harzer Wandernadel hiking network. Another nearby checkpoint is the Oberharzblick am Buchenberg (Upper Harz view on the Buchenberg hill), which is further south and has good views looking towards the two highest mountains of the Harz: the Wurmberg and the Brocken.

Personalities 
 Albert Schneider (1838–1910), surveyor and railway director
 Karl Gronau (1889-1950), high school teacher

References

External links 
 www.trautenstein.de

Former municipalities in Saxony-Anhalt
Oberharz am Brocken
Villages in the Harz
Duchy of Brunswick